"So Hot Now / Separate" is a split single from British indie rock band The Cribs and American alternative rock band The Thermals, released on Kill Rock Stars on 17 April 2010. The single found release as part of Record Store Day 2010.

Song information
The Cribs originally released "So Hot Now" as a B-side to "Cheat on Me" in September 2009, with Gary on guitar and Ryan on bass duties. The Thermals released "Separate" as a between-albums single, bridging Now We Can See in 2009 and Personal Life, following in September 2010.

Track listing

Footnotes

External links
Official band website
Official record label website

2010 singles
The Cribs songs
Songs written by Johnny Marr
Songs written by Gary Jarman
Songs written by Ross Jarman
Songs written by Ryan Jarman
2010 songs